Starting Over is the fourth studio album by American musician Chris Stapleton. The album was released on November 13, 2020, by Mercury Nashville. At the 64th Grammy Awards it won the award for Best Country Album.

Composition 
The singer-songwriter's fourth recording project consists of fourteen tracks produced with Dave Cobb, and features writing by John Fogerty, Mike Henderson, Mike Campbell, Susanna Clarke and Guy Clark. Interviewed by Vulture Magazine, Stapleton said: "There’s a lot on this record that I’m finding out, as I’m starting to talk about it a bit, was very reactionary and in the moment. On previous records, there was songwriting that probably took place in a working songwriter vacuum, that sat around for a number of years and found a purpose when it was time to make a record. [...] This project is much more about my current day-to-day life."

Critical reception 

Starting Over received generally positive reviews from critics. At Metacritic, which assigns a normalized rating out of 100 to reviews from critics, the album received an average score of 81, which indicates "universal acclaim", based on 10 reviews.

Jonathan Bernstein of Rolling Stone reports that "Starting Over feels comfortable experimenting with whatever its author throws at it" as Stapleton "digs deep into familiar territory, spinning a fiery tale of liberation", finding it a "sincere tale".

Chris Willman of Variety finds that "Starting Over is not intended to live up to its title; if anyone is so solid in his musical convictions that he could never try to reinvent himself, it's Stapleton. But it would be hard to consider an album that contains not just one but two Guy Clark covers that pay homage to one of Stapleton's songwriting heroes as banal".

Jeremy Winograd of Slant Magazine finds the arrangements of the songs "sparse and uncluttered" leaving the singer-songwriter's voice "raw". Although he finds the vocal presence of his wife Morgane a testament to the songs' authenticity, he writes that "predictably, it only shifts his focus from love and tenderness to mild hedonism" finding them "largely limited".

Awards

Commercial performance
Starting Over debuted at number three on the US Billboard 200 selling 103,000 units in its first week.

Track listing
All tracks are produced by Dave Cobb and Chris Stapleton.

Personnel
Adapted from liner notes.

Chris Stapleton − lead vocals (all tracks), background vocals (tracks 5, 7, 10), acoustic guitar (tracks 1–3, 6–8, 10, 11, 14), electric guitar (tracks 2–7, 9–13), mandolin (track 2), octophone (track 7), string arrangements (track 3)
Dave Cobb − acoustic guitar (all tracks except 10 and 14), percussion (track 5), string arrangements (track 3)
J.T. Cure − bass guitar (all tracks except 14), upright bass (track 14)
Derek Mixon − drums (all tracks), percussion (track 5), tambourine (track 3)
Morgane Stapleton − background vocals (tracks 1, 3, 4, 8, 10, 11, 13, 14), tambourine (tracks 2, 5, 10, 13)
Additional Personnel
Benmont Tench − Hammond B-3 organ (tracks 1, 3, 6, 8, 11, 13, 14), piano (tracks 3, 8, 11), upright piano (track 5), Wurlitzer (tracks 1, 8)
Mike Campbell − electric guitar (tracks 5, 12)
Paul Franklin − pedal steel guitar (tracks 10, 14)
Stephen Lamb − copyist (track 3)

 String Section (track 3)
 David Angell - violin
 Jenny Bifano − violin 
 David Davidson − violin
 Conni Ellisor − violin 
 Alicia Engstrom − violin 
 Mary Kathryn Vanosdale − violin
 Karyn Winkleman − violin 
 Kevin Bates − cello 
 Austin Hoke − cello 
 Carole Rabinowitz − cello 
 Sari Reist − cello
 Kris Wilkinson − viola, string arrangements
 Choir (track 12)
 Traneshia Chiles 
 Tamika Harris 
 Jordan Holland 
 Lauren McClinton 
 Marqo Patton 
 Lenesha Randolph 
 Shannon Sanders 
 Melody Sheppard

Charts

Weekly charts

Year-end charts

Certifications

References

2020 albums
Albums produced by Dave Cobb
Chris Stapleton albums
Grammy Award for Best Country Album
Mercury Nashville albums